

257001–257100 

|-id=005
| 257005 Arpadpal ||  || Árpád Pál  (1929–2006), a Romanian astronomer and professor at Babeș-Bolyai University in Cluj-Napoca. || 
|}

257101–257200 

|-bgcolor=#f2f2f2
| colspan=4 align=center | 
|}

257201–257300 

|-id=211
| 257211 Kulizoli ||  || Zoltán Kuli (born 1977), a Hungarian physicist, amateur astronomer and a discoverer of minor planets. He is the head of the technical department at Konkoly Observatory and was instrumental in installing a large CCD-camera on the Schmidt telescope at the Piszkéstető Station near Budapest. || 
|-id=212
| 257212 Rózsahegyi ||  || Márton Rózsahegyi (born 1979), a Hungarian environmental researcher, science communicator and amateur astronomer, who was instrumental in installing a wide field-of-view camera on the Schmidt telescope at Piszkéstető Station. || 
|-id=234
| 257234 Güntherkurtze ||  || Günther Kurtze (1921–1986), a physicist and professor of acoustics at Karlsruhe Institute of Technology in Germany || 
|-id=248
| 257248 Chouchiehlun ||  || Jay Chou (born 1979) is one of the most famous musicians in Asia || 
|-id=261
| 257261 Ovechkin ||  || Alexander Ovechkin (born 1985), a Russian ice-hockey winger who began his career with the Dynamo Moscow || 
|-id=296
| 257296 Jessicaamy ||  || Jessica Amy Todd (born 1994), daughter of the Australian discoverer Michael Todd || 
|}

257301–257400 

|-id=336
| 257336 Noeliasanchez ||  || Noelia Sanchez (born 1975) is an aeronautical engineer and co-founder of the DEIMOS space company, where she works as Head of the Space Situational Awareness Division for NEO and Space Debris. || 
|-id=371
| 257371 Miguelbello ||  || Miguel Bello (born 1961), the founder and CEO of the DEIMOS space company. || 
|}

257401–257500 

|-id=439
| 257439 Peppeprosperini ||  || Giuseppe Prosperini (1937–2005), an Italian amateur astronomer, observer of lunar and minor-planet occultations, and a co-founder of the Frasso Sabino Observatory || 
|}

257501–257600 

|-id=515
| 257515 Zapperudi ||  || Rudolf Zappe (born 1928), a longtime member of the "Linzer Astronomische Gemeinschaft" || 
|-id=533
| 257533 Iquique ||  || Iquique, a port city in northern Chile || 
|}

257601–257700 

|-bgcolor=#f2f2f2
| colspan=4 align=center | 
|}

257701–257800 

|-bgcolor=#f2f2f2
| colspan=4 align=center | 
|}

257801–257900 

|-bgcolor=#f2f2f2
| colspan=4 align=center | 
|}

257901–258000 

|-bgcolor=#f2f2f2
| colspan=4 align=center | 
|}

References 

257001-258000